Rachel Cliff (born 1 April 1988) is a Canadian long-distance runner. She competed in the women's 10,000 meters at the 2017 World Championships in Athletics. In 2018, she set the Canadian record with a time of 1:10:08 in The Woodlands Half-Marathon, in March 2018. The same year, Cliff also secured the fastest ever debut-marathon by a Canadian woman when finishing the 2018 Berlin Marathon in 11th place. She won the bronze medal in the 10,000m at the 2018 NACAC Championships and placed 9th at both the 2015 Universiade 5000m in Korea, as well as the 10,000m at the 2018 Commonwealth Games. At the Nagoya Women's 2019 Marathon, she set the Canadian record, running the Japanese marathon as only her second career marathon ever.

References

External links
 
 
 

1988 births
Living people
Canadian female long-distance runners
World Athletics Championships athletes for Canada
Place of birth missing (living people)
Athletes (track and field) at the 2018 Commonwealth Games
Athletes (track and field) at the 2019 Pan American Games
Pan American Games bronze medalists for Canada
Pan American Games medalists in athletics (track and field)
Pan American Games track and field athletes for Canada
Medalists at the 2019 Pan American Games
Commonwealth Games competitors for Canada
21st-century Canadian women